Lyle Dean MacWilliam (born 31 July 1949) was a New Democratic member of the House of Commons of Canada from 1988 to 1993, representing the constituency of Okanagan-Shuswap.

Born in Vancouver, British Columbia, the son of John Michael MacWilliam and Doris Louise Coghill, MacWilliam studied at Simon Fraser University. In 1971, he married Arlene Leslie Sundvick.

MacWilliam ran unsuccessfully for a seat in the Legislative Assembly of British Columbia in 1983. He was elected to represent Okanagan North in the assembly as a New Democratic Party member in a 1984 by-election held following the death of Donald James Campbell. At the time, MacWilliam's victory was considered a major upset as he was a 35-year old high school teacher facing off against Harold
Thorlakson, a popular area rancher representing the governing Social Credit Party in a seat the party had held consistently since 1952.

In the lead-up to the 1986 provincial election, MacWilliam became embroiled in an internal party debate over whether to force the resignation of then-leader Bob Skelly, with some in the party concerned about Skelly's popularity compared to that of the new Premier Bill Vander Zalm. MacWilliam spoke candidly about the party's internal discussions to the Canadian Press, commenting "This is a very sensitive topic and I think I might be overstepping my limits on this." MacWilliam was defeated in his bid for reelection in the province's 1986 election. 

MacWilliam entered federal politics after winning the 1988 federal election at the Okanagan—Shuswap electoral district for the New Democratic Party. During his tenure in parliament, MacWilliam earned a reputation as a rebellious partisan, often breaking with his caucus on votes. Notably, in 1992, MacWilliam was one of five NDP MPs who publicly broke with party leader Audrey McLaughlin over Bill C-81, which updated legislation surrounding referendums. The party's official position was that the bill needed firm spending caps for referendum sides, which MacWilliam disregarded in his vote. By the end of 1992, Vancouver Sun columnist Peter O'Neil gave MacWilliam a grade of "C−" on his performance, writing that the MP's "judgment [was] in question." In his 1993 bid for re-election, MacWilliam lost to Darrel Stinson of the Reform Party.

In 1997, MacWilliam announced he would be joining the Liberal Party and contest his former seat in the 1997 federal election. In an interview given to the Okanagan Saturday, MacWilliam indicated that he had grown disillusioned with the NDP not long after being elected to parliament, claiming he "came very close to sitting as an independent." This was despite his position as the party's communications critic and decision to run again under the party's banner. MacWilliams also stated the Liberals were courting him during the 1993 election and critiqued the party's ideology and ties to organized labour. In the general election, he was again defeated by Stinson, placing second with only 175 fewer votes than he had received running as a New Democrat in 1993.

Electoral Results

References

1949 births
Living people
British Columbia New Democratic Party MLAs
Members of the House of Commons of Canada from British Columbia
New Democratic Party MPs
Politicians from Vancouver
Simon Fraser University alumni